Maister is a surname. Notable people with the surname include:
Barry Maister (born 1948), New Zealand field hockey player
Beau Maister (born 1986), Australian rules football player
David Maister (born 1947), British-American professor of business administrator
Rudolf Maister (1874–1934), Slovene military officer, poet and political activist
Selwyn Maister (born 1946), New Zealand field hockey player